The 1972–73 Yorkshire Football League was the 47th season in the history of the Yorkshire Football League, a football competition in England.

Division One

Division One featured 12 clubs which competed in the previous season, along with four new clubs, promoted from Division Two:
Barton Town
Brook Sports
Kiveton Park
Yorkshire Amateur

League table

Map

Division Two

Division Two featured nine clubs which competed in the previous season, along with seven new clubs.
Clubs relegated from Division One:
Ossett Albion
Scarborough reserves
Thackley
Clubs promoted from Division Three:
Harrogate Town
Leeds Ashley Road
Woolley Miners Welfare
Worsbrough Bridge Miners Welfare Athletic

League table

Map

Division Three

Division Three featured ten clubs which competed in the previous season, along with six new clubs.
Clubs relegated from Division Two:
Brodsworth Miners Welfare
Heeley Amateurs
Plus:
Liversedge, joined from the West Riding League
Pickering Town, joined from the York Football League
Sheffield Polytechnic
Worksop Town reserves

League table

Map

League Cup

Final

References

1972–73 in English football leagues
Yorkshire Football League